The 1896–97 Scottish Division One season was won by Heart of Midlothian, two points ahead of nearest rival Hibernian.

League table

Results

References 

 Scottish Football Archive

1896–97 Scottish Football League
Scottish Division One seasons